1545 Thernöe is an elongated background asteroid from the central region of the asteroid belt. It was discovered on 15 October 1941, by Finnish astronomer Liisi Oterma at Turku Observatory in Southwest Finland. It was later named after Danish astronomer Karl August Thernöe.

Orbit 

Thernöe orbits the Sun in the central main-belt at a distance of 2.1–3.4 AU once every 4 years and 7 months (1,684 days). Its orbit has an eccentricity of 0.24 and an inclination of 3° with respect to the ecliptic.

Naming 

This minor planet was named after Karl August Thernöe (1911–1987), Danish astronomer and celestial mechanic at Østervold Observatory in Copenhagen. He was also a popularizer of astronomy and director of IAU's Central Bureau for Astronomical Telegrams during 1950–1964. The official  was published by the Minor Planet Center on 20 February 1976.

Physical characteristics

Spectral type 

In the SMASS taxonomy, Thernöe is classified as a rare K-type asteroid, a newly introduced subtype that belongs to the broader S-complex of stony bodies. Conversely, CALL groups Thernöe into the carbonaceous C-complex.

Rotation period and pole 

In December 2006, a rotational lightcurve of Thernöe was obtained from photometric observations by French amateur astronomer René Roy. Lightcurve analysis gave a well-defined rotation period of 17.20 hours with a brightness variation of 0.76 magnitude. The high lightcurve-amplitude of 0.76 indicates that the body has a non-spheroidal shape.

A 2016-published lightcurve, using modeled photometric data from the Lowell Photometric Database, gave a concurring period of 17.20321 hours, as well as a spin axis of (164.0°, −5.0°) in ecliptic coordinates (λ, β).

Diameter and albedo 

According to the surveys carried out by the Infrared Astronomical Satellite IRAS, the Japanese Akari satellite, and NASA's Wide-field Infrared Survey Explorer with its subsequent NEOWISE mission, Thernöe measures between 16.12 and 19.37 kilometers in diameter and its surface has an albedo between 0.092 and 0.13. The Collaborative Asteroid Lightcurve Link (CALL) adopts the results obtained by IRAS, that is, an albedo of 0.0962 and diameter of 18.71 kilometers with an absolute magnitude of 11.8.

References

External links 
 Lightcurve Database Query (LCDB), at www.minorplanet.info
 Dictionary of Minor Planet Names, Google books
 Asteroids and comets rotation curves, CdR – Geneva Observatory, Raoul Behrend
 Discovery Circumstances: Numbered Minor Planets (1)-(5000) – Minor Planet Center
 
 

001545
Discoveries by Liisi Oterma
Named minor planets
001545
19411015